Martin Scott Field (born September 13, 1956) was the eighth bishop of the Episcopal Diocese of West Missouri from March 6, 2011 until September 14, 2021.

Early life and education
Field was born on September 13, 1956 in Salem, Ohio. He was educated at Salem High School in Salem, Ohio, graduating in 1974. He then studied at Bethany College from where he earned a Bachelor of Arts in religious studies. He also earned a Master of Divinity in May 1983 from the Lexington Theological Seminary. He also undertook a Doctor of Ministry in congregational development at the Seabury-Western Theological Seminary in Evanston, Illinois between 2004 and 2006.

Ordained Ministry 
Field was ordained into ministry in the Christian Church (Disciples of Christ) on June 6, 1983 after which he ministered in Maryland and Ohio. After two years he joined the Episcopal Church and served as youth minister at St John's Church in Chevy Chase, Maryland from 1985 until 1989. His ministry was then translated into the Holy Orders of the Episcopal Church when he was ordained a deacon on October 10, 1990, in the Diocese of Hawaii. He was ordained a priest in Hawaii on May 2, 1991 by Bishop Donald Purple Hart. He was a non-stipendiary assistant at St Christopher's Church in Kailua, Hawaii between 1989 and 1993, after which he became interim rector of St Matthew's Church in Covington, Tennessee and in 1996 interim rector of St Anne's Church in Millington, Tennessee.  

He entered the Chaplain Corps of the U.S. Navy and served in Hawaii and Tennessee while on active duty. He also participated in several overseas deployments including Operation Desert Shield, Operation Desert Storm, and Operation Southern Watch. After naval chaplaincy, he served as associate rector at St Luke's Church in Jackson, Tennessee from 1998 until 2003 and then rector of St Paul's Church in Flint, Michigan.

Episcopacy
Field was elected the 8th bishop of West Missouri on November 6, 2010. He was ordained and consecrated as bishop on March 6, 2011 by Presiding Bishop Katharine Jefferts Schori. On Holy Cross Day, 2021 Bishop Field resigned from his ministry as the eighth Bishop of West Missouri. In 2022 he became interim rector of St Luke's Church in Worcester, Massachusetts. He married Donna Jean Cassarino on August 4, 1979, and the couple has two children: Chandra and Christopher.

See also
 List of Episcopal bishops of the United States
 Historical list of the Episcopal bishops of the United States

References 

Living people
Place of birth missing (living people)
1956 births
Episcopal bishops of West Missouri
United States Navy chaplains
Bethany College (West Virginia) alumni
Seabury-Western Theological Seminary alumni
Lexington Theological Seminary alumni
Converts to Anglicanism